Midway is an unincorporated community in Scott County, Mississippi, United States.

References

Unincorporated communities in Scott County, Mississippi
Unincorporated communities in Mississippi